Curtis Ray Wardle (born November 16, 1960) is a former Major League Baseball pitcher who played for two seasons. 

 Curtis pitched for the Minnesota Twins from 1984 to 1985 and the Cleveland Indians in 1985. One highlight of Wardle's brief major league career came on May 20, 1985. Wardle pitched a perfect 9th inning for his only major league save. It secured a 5-2 Twins victory over the Red Sox.

Wardle attended the University of California, Riverside, where he played college baseball for the Highlanders in 1981.

References

External links

Pura Pelota (Venezuelan Winter League)

1960 births
Living people
Baseball players from California
Cleveland Indians players
Huntsville Stars players
Maine Guides players
Major League Baseball pitchers
Minnesota Twins players
Orlando Twins players
San Bernardino Valley College alumni
SBVC Wolverines baseball players
Sportspeople from Downey, California
Tigres de Aragua players
American expatriate baseball players in Venezuela
UC Riverside Highlanders baseball players
University of California, Riverside alumni
Visalia Oaks players
Wisconsin Rapids Twins players